Mariana Durleșteanu (born 5 September 1971) is a politician and economist who was Ambassador of Moldova to London from 2005 until 2008.

Durleșteanu was Minister of Finance in the Moldovan Government from 2008 until the change of government in 2009.

Honours
  Member, Ordinul „Gloria Muncii” (2002)

See also
 Politics of Moldova

References

1971 births
Living people
Politicians from Chișinău
Moldovan economists
Ambassadors of Moldova to the United Kingdom
Moldovan Ministers of Finance
Women chief financial officers
Recipients of the Order of Work Glory
Moldovan women ambassadors
Female finance ministers
Diplomats from Chișinău